The long-tailed giant rat (Leopoldamys sabanus) is a species of rodent in the family Muridae. It is found in Bangladesh, Cambodia, Indonesia, Laos, Malaysia, Thailand, and Vietnam.

References

Rats of Asia
Rodents of Bangladesh
Rodents of India
Rodents of Southeast Asia
Rodents of Myanmar
Rodents of Laos
Rodents of Vietnam
Rodents of Cambodia
Rodents of Thailand
Rodents of Indonesia
Rodents of Malaysia
Leopoldamys
Mammals described in 1887
Taxa named by Oldfield Thomas
Taxonomy articles created by Polbot